Brad Gilbert and Vince Van Patten were the defending champions but only Gilbert competed that year with Kevin Curren.

Curren and Gilbert lost in the quarterfinals to Andrés Gómez and Slobodan Živojinović. Paul Annacone and Christo van Rensburg won in the final 6–2, 6–4, 6–4 against Ken Flach and Robert Seguso.

Seeds

Draw

Finals

Top half

Section 1

Section 2

Bottom half

Section 3

Section 4

External links
1987 Lipton International Players Championships Doubles Draw

Men's Doubles